The women's free skating competition of the roller skating events at the 2011 Pan American Games was held between October 23 and 24 at the Pan American Skating Track in Guadalajara. The defending Pan American Games champion is Elizabeth Soler of Argentina, in fact all three defending medalists repeated with the same performance at these games.

Schedule
All times are Central Standard Time (UTC-6).

Results
11 athletes from 11 countries competed.

References

Roller skating at the 2011 Pan American Games